= Marjory de Schireham =

Scottish official

Marjory de Schireham (1290–1340), also spelt Marjorie, was a Scottish official. She was a customar (customs collector) in the city of Dundee and the earliest recorded of her gender in that position in Scotland. She held the position of customar from 1326 or 1327 to 1331.
